is a Japanese manufacturer of photographic lenses and CCTV security equipment.

Lens designations
 FX - Full frame
 DX - cropped digital
 AF - Auto-Focus
 AT-X Pro - professional line (constant aperture zooms or primes)
 AT-X - consumer line
 IF - Internal Focus System
 FE - Floating Element System
 NH - No Hood (10-17mm fisheye without built-in hood)

Optical design:
 AS - Aspherical Optics
 F&R - Advanced Aspherical Optics
 SD - Super Low Dispersion
 HLD - High-Refraction and Low Dispersion
 MC - Multi-Coating

Lenses

Zoom
 AT-X 107 DX AF fisheye 10-17mm 3.5~4.5 (available with and without the built-in hood. No hood version can be used on full-frame. The lens is also sold under Pentax brand.)
 AT-X 116 PRO DX AF 11–16mm 2.8
 AT-X PRO SD 11–20mm 2.8 (IF) DX
 AT-X 124 PRO DX AF 12–24mm 4 (The lens is also sold under Pentax brand)
 AT-X 124 PRO DX II SD IF AF 12–24mm 4
 AT-X PRO DX AF 12-28mm 4
 AT-X PRO FX AF 16-28mm 2.8
 AT-X 165 PRO DX AF 16–50mm 2.8 (The lens is also sold under Pentax brand)
 AT-X DX AF 16.5-135mm 3.5-5.6
 AT-X PRO FX AF 17-35mm 4
 AF 193 19-35mm 3.5~4.5 (made by Cosina)
 AT-X 235 PRO AF 20-35mm 2.8
 AF 235 20-35mm 3.5-4.5 (72mm filter)
 AF 235 II 20-35mm 3.5-4.5 (77mm filter)
 AT-X 240 AF 24-40mm 2.8
 AT-X 24-70mm PRO FX f/2.8
 AT-X 242 AF 24-200mm 3.5~5.6
 RMC 25-50mm 4
 AT-X 270 PRO AF 28-70mm 2.6-2.8
 SZ-X 287 28-70mm 2.8-4.3
 AT-X 287 PRO SV AF 28–70mm 2.8
 AT-X AF 28-70mm 2.8
 AT-X 280 PRO AF 28-80mm 2.8
 SZ-X 270 SD 28-70mm 3.5-4.5
 AT-X 285 28-85mm 3.5-4.5
 AF 28-80 3.5-5.6
 SMZ 287 28-70mm 4
 RMC 28-85mm 4
 AT-X 235 28-135mm 4-4.6
 AT-X 357 35-70mm 2.8
 RMC 35-70mm 3.5
 RMC 35-105mm 3.5
 SMZ 35-105mm 3.5-4.3
 RMC 35-135mm 4-4.5
 AT-X 352 35-200mm 3.5-4.5
 AT-X SD 35-200mm 3.5-4.5
 AF 353 SD 35-300mm 4.5-6.7
 AT-X 535 PRO DX AF 50–135mm 2.8  (The lens is also sold under Pentax brand)
 EMZ 520 50-200mm 3.5-4.5
 AT-X 525 50-250mm 4-5.6
 AT-X 120 60-120mm 2.8
 AT-X PRO FX AF 70-200mm 4 VCM-S (image stabilization)
 RMC 70-210mm 3.5
 RMC 70-210mm 4
 RMC 70-220mm 3.5
 RMC 75-150mm 3.8
 SMZ 75 75-260mm 4.5
 AT-X SD 80-200mm 2.8
 AT-X 828 AF 80-200mm 2.8
 AT-X 828 PRO AF 80-200mm 2.8
 SMZ 835 80-200mm 3.5-4.5
 SZ 820 80-200mm 4.0
 RMC 80-200mm 4.0
 RMC 80-200mm4.0
 SMZ 845 80-200mm 4.5
 RMC 80-250mm 4.5
 AT-X 840 AF 80-400mm 4.5-5.6
 AT-X 840 PRO D AF 80-400mm 4.5~5.6
 90-230mm 4.5
 AT-X 100-300mm SD 4
 AT-X 340 AF 100-300mm 4
 AT-X 340 AF II 100-300mm 4
 RMC 100-300mm 5
 SZ 10 100-300mm 5.6
 AT-X 150-500mm 5.6
 SZ-X 205 28-105mm 4-5.3
 SZ-X SD 35-200mm 4-5.6
 SZ-X 210 SD 70-210mm 4-5.6
 SZ-X 820 80-200mm 4.5 (filter 55mm)
 SZ-X 80-200mm  4.5-5.6 (filter 49mm & 52mm)

Prime

 SL 17 17mm 3.5
 AT-X 17 AF 17mm 3.5
 AT-X 17 PRO AF 17mm 3.5
 RMC 17 17mm 3.5
FiRIN 20mm 2.0 FE MF
 RMC 24mm 2.8
 SL 24 24mm 2.8
 RMC 28mm 2
 RMC 28mm 2.8
 SL 28 28mm 2.8
 AT-X M35 PRO DX AF 35mm 2.8 MACRO
 SL 35 35mm 2.8
 Opera 50mm 1.4
 AT-X M90 90mm 2.5 MACRO
 AT-X M100 AF 100mm 2.8 MACRO (internal focus, 1:2)
 AT-X M100 PRO D AF 100mm 2.8 MACRO
 SL 135 135mm 2.8
 SL 200 200mm 3.5
 AT-X 300 SD 300mm 2.8
 AT-X 300 AF II 300mm 2.8 
 AT-X 300 PRO AF 300mm 2.8
 AT-X 304 AF 300mm 4
 300mm 5.5 (preset T-mount)
 SL 300 300mm 5.6
 AT-X SD AF 400mm 5.6
 SL 400 400mm 5.6
 SL 400 SD 400mm 5.6
 400mm 6.3 (preset T-mount)
 TM 500 500mm 8 Mirror
 T600 600mm 8 (preset, lens head & focus unit)
 T800 800mm 8 (preset, lens head & focus unit)

See also 
List of photographic equipment makers
List of Tokina lenses with Nikon F-mount and integrated autofocus motor
Kenko (company) - produces lenses under the Tokina name

References

External links

  Official homepage
 Canon EOS Technoclopedia: Tokina AF Lenses for Canon EF - a lens chart with technical data, comments and test references, including discontinued models

 
Manufacturing companies of Japan
Lens manufacturers
Photography companies of Japan
Optics manufacturing companies
Japanese brands
Security equipment manufacturers
Tokina lenses
Video surveillance companies
2011 mergers and acquisitions